Baliguda is a town in Kandhamal district of Odisha, India. It is sub-divisional headquarter of Baliguda sub-division. It is the largest subdivision of Odisha. The scenic beauty attracts tourists. Maa Pattakhanda is the presiding goddess of the town. Nearby touristic destinations include Daringbadi, Belaghara, Chakapada, and Jalespatta .

References

Cities and towns in Kandhamal district